The FV4601 MBT-80 was a British experimental third-generation main battle tank, designed in the late 1970s to replace the Chieftain tank. It was eventually (and later controversially) cancelled in favour of the Challenger 1, itself an evolution of the Chieftain design.

History
By the early 1970s, there was a great disparity in the number of tanks being fielded by NATO and the Warsaw Pact in Europe. The US Army fielded the M60 which had been designed to deal with the 100 mm gun of the T-55, but could not withstand the 115 mm gun being fielded on the T-62, let alone the newer 125 mm model of the T-64 and T-72.

The same-era West German design, the Leopard 1, was very lightly armoured based on the conclusion that heavy armour had little purpose in an era of high-explosive anti-tank (HEAT) weapons of rapidly improving performance. The concept was to give the tank high manoeuvrability to allow it to outmanoeuvre the slower-moving Soviet tanks and early generation missiles that were difficult to use against moving targets. This decision proved unwise as the number of Soviet tanks grew and the idea of outmanoeuvring their massed numbers seemed unworkable, while second-generation missiles made aiming at moving targets easy.

In 1963 the United States and West Germany started a joint project to develop a new tank to be used by both forces, the MBT-70. This combined the manoeuvrability of the Leopard with improved armour that would offer better protection against HEAT rounds while adding a new missile-firing gun able to engage Soviet tanks at very long range. By the late 1960s, the MBT-70 project had repeatedly overrun its development budget and the US Congress eventually cancelled it.

By this point, the only western tank able to go head to head with the latest Soviet types was the British Army's Chieftain, introduced to service in 1967. The Chieftain had heavy armour designed specifically to defeat the 115 mm, and mounted a 120 mm gun, among the most powerful in the world, able to defeat even the latest Soviet armour. When the 125 mm gun was introduced by the Soviets, the "Stillbrew armour" package was added to keep the tank competitive. However, the Chieftain had a number of problems due to its rather poor engine and outdated suspension, both of which conspired to make cross-country performance rather limited.

The Germans were still looking for a tank to replace their now outdated Leopards, as well as the many M48 Patton tanks they still had in service. The UK was looking for a more manoeuvrable design. A new joint program was formed between the UK and West Germany to develop a Future Main Battle Tank (FMBT). This was expected to replace the Chieftain tanks starting in the 1980s, as well as the older West German tanks. In 1977, Frederick Mulley, then Secretary of State for Defence, announced that, while both countries had agreed on the specifications of the joint tank, the replacement timetables diverged to such a degree that collaboration was not practicable at that time.

The cancellation of the MBT-70 had led the US to begin the development of its own design, the XM1. Prototypes arrived in 1976 with production slated for the late 1970s. Using the UK's new Chobham armour, it was emerging as a potent design. When carefully examined by the British Army, a number of issues became apparent. Notable was the 105 mm gun, which did not have the power to defeat the latest Soviet designs at long range, the preferred action for British tankers. Moreover, the armour package had been designed to defeat either the 115 mm firing armour-piercing fin-stabilized discarding sabot (APFSDS) or 125 mm firing high-explosive anti-tank (HEAT) rounds, but could not stop the 125 mm firing APFSDS at reasonable range.

Despite this, the desire to replace the Chieftain with a more mobile design remained, and there was some consideration given to importing XM1 hulls and turrets and then fitting them out with British-made components such as engine, transmission, and the 120 mm gun from the Chieftain on a domestic production line to produce a new tank. Reports on the XM1 were not favourable though.

Ultimately the UK instead officially began development of the MBT-80 in September 1978.

This new project would build on work already carried out by the Military Vehicles and Engineering Establishment (MVEE) as far back as 1968, when they had produced a tank prototype with an external (unmanned) turret. This was followed in 1978 by another tank prototype fitted with Chobham armour. This later prototype was based on the Chieftain design, and had the designation FV4211.

Design
The MBT-80 was designed to counter all current and future armoured threats from the Eastern Bloc, combining a rifled gun, advanced composite armour and increased mobility onto one platform. Other design features included the use of a David Brown Gear Industries TN-38 transmission, a Sperry/Vickers stabilised panoramic sight for use by the tank commander, and an advanced vetronics suite incorporating Ferranti F100-L microprocessors. The MBT-80 would have also been the first operational British tank to have a crew compartment with a full environmental system; i.e. able to provide both heating, ventilation, and air conditioning for the crew.

Armament
The main armament of the MBT-80 was to be a 120 mm rifled gun, the EXP-28M1, similar in some respects to the main guns found on the Chieftain and later the Challenger 1 and Challenger 2 main battle tanks, but a new design of its own. It was an advanced development of the Royal Ordnance L11A5 tank gun, designed by the Royal Armament Research and Development Establishment (RARDE), with a split-block breach mechanism. It was one of the first tank guns to use an Electro Slag Refined Steel (ESRS) barrel. This new barrel was intended to greatly increase the fatigue life of British 120mm tank guns. The technology had been cleared for use by new tank gun designs in 1976.

The fire-control system (FCS) would access and process relevant target, environment, and gun status data from various internal and external sensors including laser rangefinders and thermal imagers, to help the main gun hit targets accurately and consistently under more adverse conditions: "First shot, first kill". Major components of the FCS included the Fire Control Computer which was the 'brains' of the FCS, the Gun Control Equipment, and the STAMPLAR sight (see below), all of which were connected together by a fully digital databus. The FCS was also designed with built-in self-test diagnostics. The commander and gunner had duplicate turret/main gun controls, so either of them could aim and fire the main gun. Ammunition for the EXP-28M1 would have included armour-piercing fin-stabilized discarding sabot (APFSDS, APDS-T), high-explosive anti-tank (HEAT), high-explosive squash head (HESH), and smoke-white phosphorus rounds.

Secondary armament would have included a 7.62 mm L37A1 General Purpose Machine Gun mounted on the commander's cupola, which could be aimed and fired from within the tank. L2A1 "ball" and L5A1 tracer rounds would have been among the ammunition available for this weapon.

Protection
The MBT-80 was going to be protected mainly by the recently developed Chobham armour, first fielded on the American M1 Abrams. The armour would have provided greater resistance against high explosive anti-tank (HEAT) rounds and kinetic energy penetrators. Thanks to the use of Chobham armour, it was anticipated that much greater use could be made of high grade aluminium alloy in the construction of the hull (the turret was steel) than in prior tank designs, helping to keep down the overall weight of the tank and therefore improve mobility and associated logistics, not to mention transportation of the tank to where it would be needed. The tank would also have had among other protection features a full active NBC defences, something that was becoming more common on military vehicles being designed and/or introduced in the late 1970s and early 1980s. This included both advanced NBC sensors and radiation/electromagnetic interference (including electromagnetic pulse) shielding to help protect the crew and vehicle systems. An extensive electronic warfare system including a dedicated electronic counter-countermeasure ability was also to be included. This system would have incorporated various countermeasures against such threats as a rocket-propelled grenade (RPG) or anti-tank guided missile (ATGM), 1st through 3rd generation.

As a thermal signature management measure, the exhaust gases from the Rolls-Royce CV12 TCA Condor engine would have been mixed with cooling air before being discharged outside the tank. This feature was also used on the Vickers Valiant MBT.

Mounted on the sides of the turret would have been two L8A1 six-barrelled 66 mm smoke grenade dischargers, the same British system was used as the M250 grenade launchers found on early models of the M1 Abrams.

Mobility
The MBT-80 was to have a longer range, more mobility, and greater speed than prior tanks. Two options were considered; the Honeywell AGT1500 gas turbine engine used by the United States's prototype XM1 Abrams tank, producing 1,500 hp, and a modified, turbocharged version of the Rolls-Royce CV12 diesel engine, also producing 1,500 hp. The CV12 was eventually picked, mainly because the AGT1500 would need substantial modification of the tank to suit the transmission that came with the engine, which had been specially designed for the XM1. The higher fuel use of the gas turbine engine was also a factor in choosing the diesel engine. The CV12 was expected to be produced at Rolls-Royce's Shrewsbury plant.

Sensors
Known sensors included:
 Sperry/Vickers stabilised sight for tank commander - Daytime sight only with ×1–10 magnification.
 PANTILI (Panoramic, Thermal Imager, Laser Integrated Sight) - 360 degree rotating thermal imager fitted with a  laser rangefinder. Accessible to both commander & gunner. Similar in concept to the hunter-killer sight found on the later Challenger 2 tank.
 Two axis stabilised monocular gunners sight incorporating a laser rangefinder and muzzle reference system, magnification ×2–3 and ×10. Backup telescope with ×8 magnification also provided.
 Driver's thermal imager - possibly the Barr & Stroud IR18 TVFS but this is unconfirmed. The IR18 was later used as part of the Challenger 1's TOGS (Thermal Observation and Gunnery Sight) system.
 STAMPLAR (Sight, Thermal, Armoured, Periscope, LAser Rangefinder) - Part of the fire control system. Directly tied into the Fire Control Computer via a digital databus.
 Roof-mounted infra-red detector - Part of the NBC defence suite, it could detect airborne chemical weapon agents and radioactive nuclear fallout. Later available as an option on the Chieftain 900 tank.

Versions and variants
Among the projected vehicles based on the MBT-80 chassis were a self-propelled anti-aircraft weapon (gun: SPAAG) using the turret of the Flakpanzer Gepard, an armoured vehicle-launched bridge (AVLB), and an armoured recovery vehicle (ARV). None of these had progressed beyond the concept stage at the time of the programme's unexpected cancellation.

Cancellation
In the aftermath of the Iranian Revolution, all orders for weapons from the United Kingdom were cancelled, including those for Shir 2 tanks. The British defence industry was heavily reliant on the Iranian market, forcing the government to cut the number of workers at ROF Leeds. At this same time, the government was looking into how they could still retain the skill and capacity at Leeds that would be needed to produce the next generation of main battle tanks. Despite attempts to put the tank into production as quickly as possible, it would not be until the mid-1980s that the MBT-80 would be ready for production even if development was drastically accelerated. In addition, there were increasing worries that Soviet tank technology was advancing at such a rate that new designs, such as the T-80, reportedly about to enter service would obsolete extant front line British MBTs far sooner than predicted formerly. Ultimately, the entire programme was cancelled in favour of the Challenger, which had been developed from the Shir 2 as a private venture, and would be in theory available for service by 1983 to replace the Chieftain tanks instead.

With its adoption as an official programme, the Challenger was also known for a time as the MBT-85. However, various research elements of the MBT-80 programme were continued to develop and mature advanced technology for the next generation of British MBTs to enter service in the early 1990s, the design of which was to be provided by the new MBT-95 programme, launched in late 1982. In the event though, the MBT-95 was superseded by the Challenger 2 programme in 1987 in part due to financial and political considerations and partly due to the unexpectedly poor performance of the original Challenger in early trials, exercises and the like which seemed to indicate an urgent need for a replacement tank in the near term, and not just to replace the remaining Chieftains as originally planned. However, the Challenger 2 was not officially chosen as the British Army's new tank until late 1991, by which time the Challenger 1's problems had been resolved, with it having racked up an excellent operational record in the Gulf War.

The MBT-80 was planned for development to be completed in 1987 and production by 1989. By 1989 the Challenger tank at the same point in time, despite having been in production for nearly seven years and officially in service for over four of those, was widely considered to be still not fully operational.

Surviving vehicles
Two test rigs were built to test the various systems that would be used in the planned MBT-80. The first, Automotive Test Rig 1 (ATR1), had a hull assembled from Shir 2 prototypes derived from the Chieftain, removable blocks of armour that either contained Chobham or steel designed to imitate it, and a dummy tank gun. It could also move under its own propulsion. ATR1 fell into the hands of a private collector but is currently in bad condition. The second rig, ATR2, was designed to test the ability to weld aluminium and steel tank hulls together to reduce weight. It also had a different turret design from the ATR1 and possesses advanced sights that were state-of-the-art at the time of construction. ATR2 is currently displayed in the Vehicle Conservation Centre of the Bovington Tank Museum in Dorset.

See also
MBT-70
British Army of the Rhine
SPRITE infrared detector
Pilkington Optronics
Bhangmeter
Fulda Gap
T-64
T-72
Group of Soviet Forces in Germany

Notes

References

External links

Main MBT-80 thread over at the Secret Projects Forum
FV4601, MBT-80

Main battle tanks of the United Kingdom
Main battle tanks of the Cold War
Abandoned military projects of the United Kingdom
History of science and technology in the United Kingdom
History of the tank
Trial and research tanks of the United Kingdom